Sundowning is the debut full-length album by Long Island hardcore punk band This Is Hell. The title refers to the sundowning associated with dementia that is common in Alzheimer's disease.  The success of the album landed This Is Hell in the "100 Bands You Need To Know for 2006" in popular music magazine Alternative Press.

Daryl Palumbo, of Glassjaw, Head Automatica, and House of Blow, lends his vocals to the track "Procession Commence" and is the second time Palumbo has provided guest vocals for a This Is Hell release.

Track listing
 "Retrospect" - 1:01
 "Prelude (Again)" - 2:30
 "Here Come the Rains" - 2:26
 "Permanence" - 4:05
 "4/8/05" - 0:28
 "The Polygraph Cheaters" - 2:29
 "Deliver Me" - 1:03
 "The Absentee Ballot" - 1:49
 "Broken Teeth" - 3:21
 "8/27/05" - 2:08
 "Procession Commence" - 2:19
 "Nobody Leaves Without Singing the Blues" - 1:55
 "Epilogue" - 2:52

Personnel
Travis Reilly - vocals
Rick Jimenez - guitar and vocals
Jeff Tiu - bass
Dan Bourke - drums
Joe Osolin - guitar

References

This Is Hell (band) albums
2006 debut albums
Trustkill Records albums
Deathwish Inc. albums
Albums with cover art by Jacob Bannon